The National Council of Structural Engineers Associations (NCSEA) is a professional association in the United States, with member organizations in 44 states.  NCSEA was established in 1993.  As of 2003, NCSEA represented 12,000 individual engineers, who are members of local state associations.

NCSEA advances the practice of structural engineering and, as the national voice for practicing structural engineers, protects the public's right to safe, sustainable and cost effective buildings, bridges and other structures. It was formed to constantly improve the level of standard of practice of the structural engineering profession throughout the United States, and to provide an identifiable resource for those needing communication with the profession. NCSEA serves the needs of the structural engineering profession, its clientele, and ...Architects, Building Code and Enforcement Authorities, Construction Industry, Owners, Developers, Public Building Agencies, Disaster Response Organizations, Licensing and Registration Boards, Legislatures and Regulatory Agencies, Structural Material Trade Groups, Public News Media, Professional and Trade Organizations, and Engineering Societies.

See also
 Structural Engineers Association of Alaska (SEAAK)
 Delaware Valley Association of Structural Engineers
 Structural Engineers Association of Northern California
 Structural Engineers Association of Alaska

References

External links
 
 Job Board
 Member Organizations
 Excellence in Structural Engineering Awards
 STRUCTURE Magazine
 Structural Engineering Certification Board - SECB

.
American engineering organizations
Professional associations based in the United States